Adharma is the Sanskrit antonym of dharma. It means "that which is not in accord with the dharma". Connotations include betrayal, discord, disharmony, unnaturalness, wrongness, evil, immorality, unrighteousness, wickedness, and vice.

Description
Adharma is derived from combining "a" with "dharma", which literally implies "not-dharma". It means immoral, sinful, wrong, wicked, unjust, unbalanced, or unnatural.

According to Bhagavata Purana's verse 6.1.40, the Yamaduta replied: the religious principles prescribed in the Vedas constitute as Dharma, and those that are not constitute as Adharma.

Ariel Glucklich translates Adharma as chaos, disorder, non-harmonious and explains it as opposite of Dharma. Glucklich states that adharma isn't the binary opposite of Dharma or absolutely unethical in Indian philosophy. Rather it is a complex functional subjective term just like dharma, with shades of meaning, that depends on circumstances, purpose and context.

Gene F. Collins Jr. defines Adharma as irreligiosity. Gene states that it is anything contrary to the laws of existence. According to him, they are those actions which are contrary to one's Dharma. Whatever facilitates spiritual growth is Dharma, and whatever impedes spiritual growth is Adharma. Following an Adharmic path means acting on three vices, which are, pride, contact, and intoxication. According to him, blind faith without regard for spiritual understanding is Adharma. Following the path of Adharma can result in a bad future.

Lineage
The Vishnu Purana recites a Hindu legend that includes Dharma and Adharma as mythical characters, and it is loaded with symbolism about virtues and vices, morality and ethics. The lineage is as follows,

See also
Anrita

References

Sanskrit words and phrases
Hindu philosophical concepts
Words and phrases with no direct English translation